Stulov (from стул meaning a chair) is a Russian masculine surname, its feminine counterpart is Stulova. It may refer to
Dmitri Stulov (born 1973), Russian ice hockey defenceman
Dmitri Stulov Jr. (born 1994), Russian ice hockey defenceman, son of Dmitri
Yuriy Stulov (born 1980), Kazakhstani volleyball player

Russian-language surnames